Jawaid Bhutto was a professor and Sindhi intellectual, who was killed on March 1, 2019, in Washington, D.C.

Education
He got primary and secondary education from his hometown Shikarpur, Sindh and then on his parents wish he joined Bolan University of Medical & Health Sciences for Bachelor of Medicine, Bachelor of Surgery degree but he discontinued and got admission in philosophy at University of Karachi in 1980. After his masters he went to Sofia University Bulgaria to pursue PhD in philosophy.

Professional career
He had been working as an assistant professor and chairman of philosophy department at University of Sindh.

Activism
Jawaid Bhutto started activism after his sister Fozia Bhutto's murder by an influential politician to get her justice.

References

1954 births
2019 deaths
People murdered in Washington, D.C.
Deaths by firearm in Washington, D.C.
Pakistani emigrants to the United States
20th-century Pakistani philosophers
21st-century Pakistani philosophers
Sofia University alumni